Vincent Jérôme (born 26 November 1984 in Château-Gontier, Mayenne) is a French former road bicycle racer, who rode professionally between 2006 and 2015 for and its previous iterations. In 2007 he won the Tour du Doubs.

Major results

2004
 1st Paris–Tours Espoirs
 8th Ronde van Vlaanderen U23
2005
 4th La Roue Tourangelle
 4th Grand Prix de Waregem
 10th Ronde van Vlaanderen U23
 10th Paris–Roubaix Espoirs
2007
 1st Tour du Doubs
 10th Trophée des Grimpeurs
2008
 3rd Tour du Doubs
2009
 6th Clásica de Almería
 9th Overall Tour de Wallonie
2011
 1st Tro-Bro Léon
2012
 6th Overall Paris–Corrèze
2013
 2nd Overall Ronde de l'Oise
2014
 6th Overall Three Days of De Panne
 8th Tro-Bro Léon
 10th Grand Prix Impanis-Van Petegem

Grand Tour general classification results timeline

References

External links 
 

1984 births
Living people
People from Château-Gontier
French male cyclists
Sportspeople from Mayenne
Cyclists from Pays de la Loire